Carla Walschap (born 20 December 1932) is a Belgian writer and a teacher. She is a daughter of the writer Gerard Walschap.

Selected works
 Niet schreien, ouwe (1956)
 Het denneboompje dat niet tevreden was (1957) 
 Hart om hart (1958)
 Rozen van Jericho (1963)
 De eskimo en de roos (1964)
 Meer suers dan soets (1977)

See also

 Flemish literature

External links
 Carla Walschap at dbnl.org
 Carla Walschap at dbnl.org

1932 births
Living people
Flemish poets
Belgian women poets
Flemish women writers